Kicking Out Shoshana ( Shoshana Khaloutz Merkazi) is a 2014 Israeli comedy-sports film directed by Shay Kanot. It features Gal Gadot, as her first role in an Israeli film. The film also stars Oshri Cohen, Mariano Idelman and Eli Finish. It was released on July 17, 2014.

Cast
 Gal Gadot as Mirit Ben Harush
 Oshri Cohen as Ami Shushan
 Eli Finish as Kushi Bokobza
 Mariano Idelman as Dede Ben Shabat
 Yossi Marshek as Sami Abu Salach
 Yaniv Biton as Nachi
 Rotem Keinan as Cheelik Eliraz
 Einat Weitzman as Paz

Production
The film features Gal Gadot after she completed her role in The Fast and the Furious franchise. She went back to Israel to shoot her first Israeli film. Principal photography for the film took place in Jerusalem.

Release
The film is co-produced and distributed by United King Films. It was released on July 17, 2014 in Israel and also released in the United States at the Israeli Film Festival. It received mixed to positive reviews from critics.

References

External links
 

2014 films
Israeli comedy films